Felicia Ţilea-Moldovan (born 29 September 1967 in Măgura Ilvei, Bistrița-Năsăud) is a Romanian javelin thrower. She is a four-time Olympian, and winner of the gold medal at the 1995 Summer Universiade in Japan. Her personal best throw is 63.89 metres.

Achievements

References
 

1967 births
Living people
Romanian female javelin throwers
Athletes (track and field) at the 1996 Summer Olympics
Athletes (track and field) at the 2000 Summer Olympics
Athletes (track and field) at the 2004 Summer Olympics
Athletes (track and field) at the 2008 Summer Olympics
Olympic athletes of Romania
World Athletics Championships medalists
Romanian masters athletes
European Athletics Championships medalists
Universiade medalists in athletics (track and field)
Romanian sportspeople in doping cases
Doping cases in athletics
Goodwill Games medalists in athletics
Universiade gold medalists for Romania
Competitors at the 1994 Goodwill Games
People from Bistrița-Năsăud County